The Sheraton Taoyuan Hotel is located in Dayuan District, Taoyuan City, Taiwan. It opened in 2010 as the Orchard Park Hotel and became a Sheraton on 22 September 2019. The hotel has 190 rooms and suites and has facilities such as a fitness center, indoor swimming pool, game room and gift shop. The hotel is a franchise of Sheraton Hotels and Resorts and is the fourth Sheraton hotel to open in Taiwan, after Sheraton Grand Taipei Hotel, Sheraton Hsinchu Hotel and Sheraton Taitung Hotel.

Restaurants and Bars
source:
U Kitchen: An international buffet restaurant offering seafood dishes from a variety of cuisines.
Hee Yuet Lau: A Cantonese restaurant serving traditional dim sum and other Chinese delicacies, such as Cantonese roasted meats, soup, shark fin soup, etc.
Hanamizuki: A Japanese restaurant offering sushi and other classic Japanese delicacies.

Transportation
The hotel is located around 10 minutes' drive from Taoyuan International Airport and 20 minutes from HSR Taoyuan Station.

See also
Sheraton Hotels and Resorts
Sheraton Grand Taipei Hotel
Sheraton Hsinchu Hotel
Sheraton Taitung Hotel
Monarch Skyline Hotel

References

External links
 Sheraton Taoyuan Hotel official site

Taoyuan
2010 establishments in Taiwan
Hotels established in 2010
Hotels in Taoyuan